The Mayor of North Tyneside is the executive mayor of the borough of North Tyneside in Tyne and Wear, England. The incumbent since 2013 is Norma Redfearn. A Mayoral Referendum was held on 5 May 2016 to determine if residents wished to retain the Mayoral system or change to a Committee system. The number of votes for continuing with the mayoral system was 32,546, which was 57.5%, while 23,703 wanted a committee system - 41.8%.

Referendum

Elections

2002

2003 by-election

A mayoral by-election was held on 12 June 2003, which was won by Linda Arkley of the Conservative Party, after Chris Morgan resigned after he was arrested in relation to police investigations over allegations of possessing indecent images of children. He was cleared of all charges the following year, but was convicted of similar offences in 2019.

2005

2009

2013

2017

2021

References

North Tyneside
Metropolitan Borough of North Tyneside